
Heinrich Recke (25 August 1890  – 18 August 1943) was a German general in the Wehrmacht during World War II who commanded several infantry divisions.  He was a recipient of the Knight's Cross of the Iron Cross of Nazi Germany.

Awards and decorations

 Knight's Cross of the Iron Cross on 4 September 1943 as Generalleutnant and commander of 161. Infanterie-Division

References

Citations

Bibliography

 

1890 births
1943 deaths
People from Chojnice
People from West Prussia
Lieutenant generals of the German Army (Wehrmacht)
German Army personnel of World War I
Prussian Army personnel
Reichswehr personnel
Recipients of the Gold German Cross
Recipients of the Knight's Cross of the Iron Cross
German Army personnel killed in World War II
Missing in action of World War II
Recipients of the clasp to the Iron Cross, 1st class
German Army generals of World War II